Pantherinae is a subfamily within the family Felidae; it was named and first described by Reginald Innes Pocock in 1917 as only including the Panthera species.

Characteristics
Pantherinae species are characterised by an imperfectly ossified hyoid bone with elastic tendons that enable their larynx to be mobile.
They have a flat rhinarium that only barely reaches the dorsal side of the nose. The area between the nostrils is narrow, and not extended sidewards as in the Felinae.

The Panthera species have a single, rounded, vocal fold with a thick mucosal lining, a large vocalis muscle, and a large cricothyroid muscle with long and narrow membranes. A vocal fold that is longer than  enables all but the snow leopard among them to roar, as it has shorter vocal folds of  that provide a lower resistance to airflow; this distinction was one reason it was proposed to be retained in the genus Uncia.

Classification
Pocock originally defined the Pantherinae as comprising the genera Panthera and Uncia. Today, Uncia has been subsumed to Panthera, and the genus Neofelis is also included.

Living genera
The following table shows the extant taxa within the Pantherinae, grouped according to the traditional phenotypical classification. Estimated genetic divergence times of the genotypical pantherine lineage are indicated in million years ago (mya), based on analysis of autosomal, xDNA, yDNA and mtDNA gene segments; and estimates based on analysis of biparental nuclear genomes.

Evolution
Several fossil Panthera species were described:
Panthera palaeosinensis lived in the early Pleistocene around two to three million years ago in northern East Asia.
Panthera spelaea lived in Europe after the third Cromerian interglacial stage from about 450,000 to 14,000 years ago.
Panthera atrox lived in North America during the Pleistocene and early Holocene about 340,000 to 11,000 years ago.
Panthera shawi was a lion-like cat in South Africa that possibly lived in the early Pleistocene.
Panthera balamoides lived in the Yucatan Peninsula in Mexico, during the Pleistocene.

There is evidence of distinct markers for the mitochondrial genome for Felidae.

Results of a DNA-based study indicate that the tiger (Panthera tigris) branched off first, followed by the jaguar (P. onca), the lion (P. leo), then the leopard (P. pardus) and snow leopard (P. uncia).

Felis pamiri, formerly referred to as Metailurus, is now considered a probable relative of extant Pantherinae.

See also
 Big cat
 List of felids

References

External links 

 
Taxa named by R. I. Pocock
Extant Miocene first appearances